Pomona Landing Airport  is a turf airstrip located  1 mile east of Pomona Park, Florida.

History 
Reopened in December 1999, the airstrip is the location of a former World War II Army Air Forces emergency landing field.  It was closed after the war and abandoned.

See also

 Florida World War II Army Airfields

References 

Airports in Florida
Airfields of the United States Army Air Forces in Florida
Transportation buildings and structures in Putnam County, Florida